Rangasthalam is the soundtrack of the 2018 Indian Telugu-language film of the same name directed by Sukumar. Composed by Devi Sri Prasad, the soundtrack contains 6 songs with lyrics by Chandrabose. The film was produced by Naveen Yerneni, Ravi Shankar Yelamanchili and Mohan Cherukuri for Mythri Movie Makers. Ram Charan and Samantha Akkineni played the lead roles, with Jagapati Babu, Aadhi Pinisetty, Prakash Raj, Naresh, Rohini and Anasuya Bharadwaj in supporting roles.

Chandrabose wrote the lyrics at Puducherry after holding discussions with Sukumar and Prasad, and completed work on five songs in four days with each one taking half an hour to complete. The tunes were composed after the lyrics were written. Lahari Music released the soundtrack on 15 March 2018 in YouTube and all other digital platforms. The soundtrack received positive reviews from the critics, who were appreciative of the lyrics and Prasad's instrumentation in tune with the film's periodic setting.

Development 
Devi Sri Prasad composed the film's soundtrack and score. The former consists of six songs, all written by Chandrabose. Chandrabose wrote the lyrics at Puducherry after holding discussions with Sukumar and Prasad. He completed writing five songs out of six in four days, with each one taking half an hour to complete. The tunes were composed after Chandrabose completed writing the lyrics.

To sound authentic, Prasad approached folk singers Shiva Nagulu, Rela Kumar and Ganta Venkata Lakshmi to provide vocals for the songs "Aa Gattununtava" and "Jigelu Rani". For the latter, he used a 70 year old clarinet as the song would reflect the mood of Rajahmundry of the 1980s. During the re-recording phase, the soundtrack version of "Aa Gattununtava" was discarded due to issues in lip syncing and the initial rough track (sung by Prasad) was used. Nagulu, however, received credit as the singer of the song in the soundtrack.

Track listing

Release 
The first single "Yentha Sakkagunnave", sung by Prasad himself, was released by Lahari Music on 13 February 2018. Two other tracks "Ranga Ranga Rangasthalana" and "Rangamma Mangamma" were released on 2 and 8 March 2018 respectively. Lahari Music released the soundtrack on 15 March 2018 in YouTube and all other digital platforms. The initial release contained only five tracks; the sixth one was excluded as it contained spoilers about the film's plot. The sixth track, titled "Orayyo", was a song used in the score for the scenes depicting Kumar Babu's funeral in the film. Sung by Chandrabose himself, "Orayyo" was released on 3 April 2018.

Critical reception 
Reviewing for Firstpost, Mridula Ramadugu termed Rangasthalam soundtrack as Prasad's "most offbeat album yet" and added, "It would be biased to say — Not one track from this album goes unnoticed; but we are going to say exactly that. We took in this pure folk so well and enjoyed every bit of it." Scroll.in, in its review of the soundtrack, opined that Prasad's compositions "channel folk tunes that could have easily found a place on the stage" with "Yentha Sakkagunnave" mirroring Sukumar's effort "to bridge the gap between the stage and the screen", thus standing out from the rest. Priyanka Sundar of Hindustan Times called the soundtrack "rustic" and "highlights the backdrop of the film well", with the song "Yentha Sakkagunnave" being the soundtrack's highlight. In contrast, Suhas Yellapantula of The Times of India called the soundtrack "one-dimensional", criticising for its lack of variety despite being in sync with the film's theme.

Awards and nominations

References 

Telugu film soundtracks
2018 soundtrack albums
Devi Sri Prasad soundtracks